Palo Blanco Airstrip  is a private dirt airstrip located 6 km south of La Purísima, Municipality of Comondú, Baja California Sur, Mexico. It is used solely for general aviation purposes. The ENW code is an identifier designated by the Direction General of Civil Aeronautics (DGAC) and can be used to file Mexican flight plans.

Contact
Fax at the public phone in San Isidro 011-52-200-124-4400 or in La Purísima 011-52-200-124-4407, -4408, -4406.

Airports in Baja California Sur
Comondú Municipality